Roberto Farnesi (born 19 July 1969) is an Italian actor.

Filmography

Films

Television

References

External links 
 

1969 births
Living people
Italian male television actors
Italian male film actors
21st-century Italian male actors